Boodleaceae is a family of green algae in the order Cladophorales.

References

 
Ulvophyceae families